Hormizd VI was a Sasanian prince who ruled from 630 to 632.

The overthrow and execution of his grandfather Khosrow II in 628 led to a civil war that saw many pretenders to the Sasanian throne. This period saw a series of monarchs with very short reigns, often of less than a year. Before Hormizd VI, Shapur-i Shahrvaraz had a short reign, before he was deposed by powerful magnate Farrukh Hormizd. He then raised the Sasanian princess Azarmidokht to the throne in Ctesiphon in 630. Shortly after, the troops of prominent Sasanian general and usurper Shahrbaraz proclaimed Horizd VI to be king in Nisibis.

He maintained himself about two years in Nisibis, until he was overthrown by the same troops who had previously supported him. Yazdegerd III, another grandson of Khosrow II, with the support of the nobles, succeeded in becoming the sole rule of the empire.

References

Sources 
 

631 deaths
7th-century Sasanian monarchs
Year of birth unknown